Catocala nymphaeoides is a moth in the family Erebidae first described by Gottlieb August Wilhelm Herrich-Schäffer in 1852. It is found in south-eastern Siberia.

References

nymphaeoides
Moths described in 1852
Moths of Asia